AS Indenié Abengourou is an Ivorian football club from Abengourou founded in 1951. They were promoted to the highest level of football in Ivory Coast. 3,000 capacity Stade Henri Konan Bédié is their home ground.

Honours
Côte d'Ivoire Premier Division: 0

Côte d'Ivoire Cup: 1
 Nugalįtojas: 1988.
 Finaliininkas : 2011 
Coupe de la Ligue de Côte d'Ivoire: 1
 2017.

Coupe Houphouët-Boigny: 0

Squad
Kevin Zougoula
 Aymerik Beda

Weblinks
 weltfussballarchiv.com

References

Football clubs in Ivory Coast
Abengourou
Sport in Comoé District